"I Feel Like Buddy Holly" is a song recorded by Alvin Stardust in 1984, written and produced by Mike Batt. The song spent 11 weeks on the UK Singles Chart, reaching number 7 in 1984. The single was released on Chrysalis Records, and included the song "Luxury" on the B-side, which was written and produced by Alvin Stardust.

The song appears on numerous compilation albums, including The Very Best of Alvin Stardust (1996), Alvin Stardust: New Recordings of His Greatest Hits (2001), Best of Alvin Stardust (2006), The Alvin Stardust Story (2007), and My Coo Ca Choo (2007).

Mike Batt, who wrote and produced the song, recorded his own version on the album A Songwriter’s Tale (2008), alongside versions of songs he had written for other artists as well as re-recordings of Batt’s own songs.

Tracks
 "I Feel Like Buddy Holly" - 4:04 (written and produced by Mike Batt)
 "Luxury" - 3:15 (written and produced by Alvin Stardust)

Charts

References

External links
 I Feel Like Buddy Holly at discogs.com

Songs about Buddy Holly
1984 singles
Alvin Stardust songs
Songs written by Mike Batt
Song recordings produced by Mike Batt
1984 songs
Chrysalis Records singles
Pop ballads
Rock ballads